Richard Browne (born 1934) is an Irish former hurler. At club level he played with Castletownroche, divisional side Avondhu and was also a member of the Cork senior hurling team.

Career

Browne first played hurling at under-14 level with Castletownroche. He never played at minor level but eventually progressed onto the club's junior team in 1952. Browne played in goal for a while before winning the first of seven North Cork JHC titles in 1954. He claimed a Cork JHC medal in 1960 before winning a Cork IHC medal in 1964. Browne's performances earned selection to the Avondhu divisional team in 1958. He completed the full set of county honours by winning a Cork SHC medal after a defeat of University College Cork in the 1966 final. Browne had a 30-year career at adult level with Castletown and he retired after winning a second Cork JHC title in 1982.

Browne first played with the Cork senior hurling team in a tournament game in the mid-1950s. He later lined out with the junior team and won a Munster JHC medal in 1959. A spell with the intermediate team resulted in Browne being called up to the senior team alongside his brother Johnny Browne for the unsuccessful 1961 Munster SHC campaign.  His last game for Cork was a defeat by Tipperary in the 1964 Munster final.

Honours

Castletownroche
Cork Intermediate Hurling Championship: 1964
Cork Junior Hurling Championship: 1960, 1982
North Cork Junior A Hurling Championship: 1954, 1956, 1957, 1960, 1978, 1979, 1982

Avondhu
Cork Senior Hurling Championship: 1966

Cork
Munster Junior Hurling Championship: 1959

References

1934 births
Living people
Castletownroche hurlers
Avondhu hurlers
Cork inter-county hurlers
Hurling goalkeepers